

The Leduc 022 was the prototype of a mixed-power French interceptor built in the mid-1950s. Designer René Leduc had been developing ramjet-powered aircraft since before World War II and had flown a series of experimental aircraft, the Leduc 0.10 and Leduc 0.21, throughout the Fifties before he was awarded a contract for two examples of a short-range supersonic interceptor armed with two air-to-air missiles (AAMs). 

Intended for combat use, the 022 was able to take off from a runway as it was fitted with a supplementary turbojet engine, unlike his earlier aircraft which required a mother aircraft to carry them to altitude because ramjets cannot produce thrust while stationary. Development was cancelled by the French Air Force (Armée de l'Air) in 1958 due to budgetary problems while flight testing was underway and before the second prototype was completed.

Background and description
In 1953 the French Air Force issued a specification for a high-performance interceptor that could intercept and destroy any aerial threat after taking off from a  grass runway. It ordered two prototype 022S aircraft in competition with the Nord Gerfaut and Griffon. Leduc used a more-powerful version of the ramjet that he had been developing since 1938 and added a turbojet to allow for more autonomous operations. Air for the ramjet was provided by six air ducts surrounding the nose section that emptied into the hollow interior of the double-walled fuselage where fuel was injected and ignited by the exhaust of a Turbomeca Artouste gas turbine.

The 022S was generally similar in configuration aside from the 30° swept wings and tricycle landing gear. It retained the thick barrel-like monocoque fuselage and the protruding nose section housing the transparent Plexiglass cockpit, but added a range-only radar. The forward part of the nose formed an escape capsule for the pilot. Its intended armament consisted of a pair of Nord AA.20 guided missiles and 24 anti-aircraft rockets. Unlike all previous Leduc aircraft, it featured a coaxial turbojet-ramjet powerplant to enable unassisted operation. The turbojet was initially a  Turbomeca Ossau engine, but this was changed during construction to a much more powerful  SNECMA Atar 101D-3.

This change caused the aircraft to be redesignated as the 022 and allowed the number of rockets to be increased to 40. First flown on 26 December 1956 on turbojet power alone, the ramjet was finally fired on the 34th flight, on 18 May 1957. It reached a speed of Mach 1.15 on 21 December 1957, but was damaged shortly afterwards when it caught fire while taking off. Construction of a second prototype had been cancelled in October and the flight testing contract was cancelled on 13 February 1958 after 141 flights had been made. The ongoing Algerian War was consuming more of the military budget and the more conventional Dassault Mirage III was selected to meet the interceptor requirement. The cancellation marked the end of Leduc's aircraft development activities.

Surviving aircraft
The unflown second prototype 022 is on display at the Musée de l'air et de l'espace at Paris–Le Bourget Airport. It was donated by the Leduc family in 1979.

Specifications

References

Bibliography

External links 

 A French-language page on the aircraft
 test flight footage for Leduc 0.10, 0.16, 0.21, and 0.22 https://www.youtube.com/watch?v=CzUJrweHxso

1950s French fighter aircraft
Leduc aircraft
Ramjet-powered aircraft